Jeff Waugh (also known as "jdub") is an Australian free software and open source software engineer. He is known for his past prominence in the GNOME and Ubuntu projects and communities.

Career 
In 2004, Waugh was hired by Mark Shuttleworth as an early employee of Canonical Ltd. and member of the Ubuntu project, where he worked in business development. At OSCON in 2005, Waugh won "Best Evangelist" in the Google-O'Reilly Open Source Awards for his evangelism of Ubuntu and GNOME. He announced his resignation from Canonical in July 2006 to focus more fully on his work in the GNOME project.

From 2007 Waugh and then-wife Pia Waugh were co-directors of Waugh Partners, an Australian Open Source consultancy launched in 2006. Waugh Partners won the 2007 NSW State Pearcey Award for Young Achievers for their work promoting Free Software to the Australian ICT industry. In 2008 Waugh was a partner of the One Laptop Per Child Australia program. In 2008 Pia Waugh moved to a new career; Waugh's later employers have included Bulletproof Networks and Kounta.

Positions 
Waugh has served in a number of formal and semi-formal positions in Free Software development and community projects:
 Director, Open Source Industry Australia, 2008
 Director, the GNOME Foundation board, 2003–2004 and 2006–2008
 Member of the linux.conf.au 2007 organising team
 Chairman of the Annodex Foundation 2005–2006
 GNOME release manager 2001–2005
 President of the Sydney Linux Users Group, 2002–2003
 Member of the committee of the Sydney Linux Users Group, 2000–2002.
 Member of the linux.conf.au 2001 organising team

Other development projects 
Waugh is an author of the Python feed aggregator Planet.

Personal life
Waugh was married to fellow open-source advocate and community leader Pia Waugh until 2011. He wrote on his blog in September 2011, on the occasion of RUOK? Day, that he had been struggling with depression since his late teens, and that it had been a contributing factor to the divorce, but that he felt he had overcome it.

References

External links
 "Software that 'just works'" – 2003 Sydney Morning Herald interview with Jeff Waugh
 "Open sore on Planet GNOME" – 2008 iTWire story on Planet GNOME
 "Open source survey: many questions remain" iTWire story on OSS survey
 "GNOME needs to get its act together" iTWire story on GNOME project

Living people
Open source people
Free software programmers
Year of birth missing (living people)
Australian computer specialists
GNOME developers
Ubuntu (operating system) people
People from Sydney
Australian bloggers